The Province of Gorizia was a province in the autonomous Friuli–Venezia Giulia region of Italy, which was disbanded on 30 September 2017.

Overview
Its capital was the city of Gorizia. It belonged to the Province of Udine between 1924 and 1927 and the communes of Sonzia, Plezzo, Bergogna, Caporetto, Tolmino, Circhina, Santa Lucia d'Isonzo, Gracova Serravalle, Canale d'Isonzo, Cal di Canale, Idria, Montenero d'Idria, Castel Dobra, Salona d'Isonzo, Gargaro,  Chiapovano, Aidussina, Santa Croce di Aidùssina, Cernizza Goriziana, Tarnova della Selva, Sambasso, Merna, Ranziano, Montespino, Opacchiasella, Temenizza, Rifembergo, Comeno, San Daniele del Carso, Zolla, Vipacco, San Martino di Quisca and San Vito di Vipacco; and the eastern part of Gorizia, were part of this province between 1918 and 1924, and from 1927 to 1947. These communes are now part of Slovenia.

There were 25 communes in the province.

Around 11% of the population of the province was ethnically Slovenian. Italian legislation ensures the protection of the Slovene linguistic minority in 9 of the 25 municipalities which comprised the province. Three rural municipalities (Doberdò del Lago, Savogna d'Isonzo and San Floriano del Collio) had an ethnically Slovene majority, but the majority of native Slovene speakers in the Province lived in the urban area of Gorizia.

The top ten countries of origin of the inhabitants of Gorizia with foreign citizenship at 31 December 2010 were:
 1603
 1153
 1092
 851
 799
 646
 502
 431
 427
 374

See also
Gorizia and Gradisca
Julian March
Slovene minority in Italy

Notes

References

External links

 Official website  

 
Gorizia